Bear Swamp Preserve is a Nature Conservancy preserve and National Natural Landmark in Westerlo, New York. It consists of a pond and surrounding  of swamp and woodland. It is recognized for its great laurel tree population.

See also
List of National Natural Landmarks in New York

References

External links
 The Nature Conservancy: Bear Swamp Preserve

National Natural Landmarks in New York (state)
Geography of Albany County, New York
Nature Conservancy preserves in New York (state)